The Constitution Act 1902 is the founding document of the State of New South Wales, and sets out many of the basic principles of the Government of New South Wales. This act created the foundation of the Executive, Legislative and Judicial branches of the Government of New South Wales. Most of the Constitution can be amended through ordinary Acts of Parliament, however some sections can only be amended through a referendum of NSW voters.

History
In 1853 the New South Wales Legislative Council, then a unicameral body, with a hybrid of appointed and elected members, passed the New South Wales Constitution Bill in 1853, also referred to as 17 Vic. No 41, which was reserved for the Queen's assent, which the Queen did not give. Instead the Imperial Parliament at Westminster passed what is referred to as the Constitution Statute 1855 (Imp) which included a modified bill as schedule. It was this modified bill to which the Queen assented. The 1902 Act repealed all or part of 8 previous acts.

Document structure and text
The Act as made consisted of 6 parts, to which an additional 5 parts have since been added.

Part 1 Preliminary.
Part 2 Powers of the Legislature.
Part 2A The Governor, added in 1987.
Part 3 The Legislative Council and Legislative Assembly.
Part 4 The Executive.
Part 4A Parliamentary Secretaries, added in 1975.
Part 5 The Consolidated Fund.
Part 6 Officers and staff.
Part 7 Administrative arrangements, added in 1984.
Part 8 Local government, added in 1986.
Part 9 The judiciary, added in 1992.

Alterations to the Constitution

By parliament
The Constitution Act 1902Act as made in 1902 was an act of the New South Wales Parliament. In contrast to the Constitution of Australia it was not approved by a referendum and did not contain any provision requiring a referendum to alter the constitution. In 1929 the parliament passed an amendment to the Constitution Act which inserted section 7A, requiring a referendum before the Legislative Council could be abolished. In 1930 Labor MLCs put forward two bills, one to repeal section 7A, the other to abolish the Council. Believing that a referendum was necessary before the bills could become law, the Legislative Council permitted the bills to pass without a division on 10 December. The validity of section 7A and the inability to repeal the section without a referendum were upheld by the Supreme Court on 23 December 1930, a majority of the High Court on 16 March 1931, and the Judicial Committee of the Privy Council on 31 May 1932.

Referendums
There have been 18 referendums in New South Wales, 8 of which concerned proposals to amend the New South Wales Constitution, half of which concerned the Legislative Council. The list does not include referendums that did not involve changes to the NSW constitution, such as the 1898 and 1899 referendums on the proposed constitution of Australia, the 1903 referendum on the number of Members of the Legislative Assembly and the 5 referendums on the sale of alcohol.

Effect of the Constitution of Australia
The Constitution of Australia sets up the Commonwealth of Australia as a federal polity, with enumerated limited specific powers conferred on the Federal Parliament. The relationship between the States and the Commonwealth are dealt with in chapter V, including section 109 which provides that state laws are invalid to the extent of any inconsistency with federal laws. For the first two decades, the High Court stayed reasonably true to the "co-ordinate" vision of the framers in which the Commonwealth and the States were both financially and politically independent within their own spheres of responsibility. The court did so by adopting the 'reserved state powers' doctrine, combined with "implied inter-governmental immunities", to protect both the Commonwealth and the states from legislative or executive action which "would fetter, control, or interfere with, the free exercise" of the legislative or executive power of the other. The High Court emphatically rejected the reserved state powers doctrine in the 1920 Engineers' Case after changes in the composition of the Court.

The High Court has held that the structure and text of the Constitution of Australia is such that the it protects the independence of the State Supreme Courts and a state parliament cannot assign powers that are incompatible with that independence, nor prevent State Supreme Courts from issuing prerogative relief for jurisdictional error.

Notes

References

External links

New South Wales legislation
New South Wales